Robby Maria & The Silent Revolution is the only studio album of the former Berlin based band Robby Maria & The Silent Revolution around singer-songwriter Robby Maria. It was released on 20 April 2012.

Origin 
The Album was written by Robby Maria and drummer Anni Müller and recorded with Ben Hunt on electric guitar and Simon Birkholz on bass during Winter 2010/2011 in various studios all over Berlin and Nicosia. The tracks "9o1 Independence", "Cars & Highways", "Could've Been" und "Down By The Water", which Maria originally wrote with songwriter Stephan Metzner for the Poetry-Album 9o1 Independence on the Island of Cyprus were included as bonus tracks.

Track listing
all music composed by Robby Maria, except track 11-14 by Stephan Metzner. All lyrics by Robby Maria.
 The Spanish House – 1:50
 Immigrants – 2:22
 22nd Century Girl – 4:00
 Build Me A Woman – 3:44
 Nostradamus' Years – 3:12
 Break The Silence – 3:30
 Ship To Shore (Organ Version) – 2:43
 Like A Zombie – 3:57
 Surprise – 3:17
 Satellite City – 6:20
 9o1 Independence – 2:54
 Cars & Highways – 5:18
 Could've Been – 4:43
 Down By The Water – 3:14

Personnel
Anni Müller – drums, percussions
Ben Hunt - electric guitars, background vocals
Simon Birkholz - bass guitar, organ

Album Ratings
Marcel Peteroff wrote:"... i cannot deny an analogy to the early David Bowie plus an enormous originality that is hard to judge".
Blackbirds TV wrote"...extremely charismatic!"

References 

2012 albums
Robby Maria albums